Jens Reno Møller (born 3 January 1971) is a Danish racing driver currently competing in the TCR International Series. Having previously competed in the Danish Touringcar Championship, European Touring Car Cup and Le Mans Series amongst others.

Racing career
Møller began his career in 2002 in the Danish Touringcar Championship, finishing twentieth in the standings. He continued in the championship for many years, finishing seventh in the overall championship standings in 2009, as well as winning the independent championship that year. In the 2004 he made his 24 Hours of Le Mans debut with the Lister Storm Racing team, teaming up with fellow Danes John Nielsen and Casper Elgaard, they finished ninth in the LMP1 class. He returned in 2006 again racing with the Lister team, but this time teaming up with Brit Gavin Pickering and fellow Dane Nicolas Kiesa. The teams retired from the race after having completed 192 laps. In 2007 he entered the European Touring Car Cup, he finished seventh in Race 1 and retired in Race 2, finishing ninth in the championship standings. He returned in 2008, finishing sixth in both races and ending up fifth in the championship standings. In 2010 he took part in his last Danish Touringcar Championship season, as well as taking part in the Scandinavian Touring Car Cup. Møller finished fourth in the overall DTC standings taking two victories and winning the independent championship title. In the Scandinavian championship he finished fifthtenth in standings. After a six-year hiatus from racing Møller made his racing return in 2016, making his Danish Supertourisme Turbo debut. He finished eleventh in standings taking two podiums.

In March 2017 it was announced that he would race in the TCR International Series, driving a Honda Civic Type R TCR for his own Reno Racing team.

Racing record

24 Hours of Le Mans results

Complete TCR International Series results
(key) (Races in bold indicate pole position) (Races in italics indicate fastest lap)

† Driver did not finish the race, but was classified as he completed over 90% of the race distance.

Complete TCR Europe Series results
(key) (Races in bold indicate pole position) (Races in italics indicate fastest lap)

References

External links
 

1971 births
People from Ikast-Brande Municipality
Living people
TCR International Series drivers
Danish racing drivers
24 Hours of Le Mans drivers
Danish Touring Car Championship drivers
European Touring Car Cup drivers
Sportspeople from the Central Denmark Region
FIA Motorsport Games drivers
Le Mans Cup drivers
TCR Europe Touring Car Series drivers